Art in the San Francisco Bay Area, 1945-1980: An Illustrated History is a 1985 nonfiction book by art critic Thomas Albright, about the modern history of art in the San Francisco Bay Area. It was published by the University of California Press.

Subjects
Albright covers the movements in modern art in which the Bay Area were heavily involved, and their practitioners, including Clyfford Still and Abstract Expressionism, the Modernist school, Pop Art, Formalism, The Bay Area Figurative Movement, Conceptual art, Photorealism, and others. The book contains numerous reproductions of the works discussed.

References

See also

Art in the San Francisco Bay Area, article covering the subject, beyond the modern period

Books about the San Francisco Bay Area
Art in the San Francisco Bay Area
1985 non-fiction books
Art criticism
Art history books
American art movements
Case studies
Modern art
University of California Press books